Nabalus is a genus of Asian and North American flowering plants in the tribe Cichorieae within the family Asteraceae.

Nabalus is now considered the correct name for a group of plants in North America that were formerly considered to be members of Prenanthes, and were included in that genus in the Flora of North America treatment.  Common names for the genus include "rattlesnake root" and "white lettuce." The latter reflects its close relationship to lettuce (Lactuca sativa) but having flowers that are whitish or purplish-white in some species.  Many (perhaps all) of the species are monocarpic perennials, in which an individual plant may live for multiple years in a vegetative condition but then will die after flowering and fruiting.

Natural history

White lettuce is firmly identified with common lettuce, Lactuca sativa. Lactuca sativa has its inceptions in the Middle East. Egyptian divider paintings of Min, the divine force of fruitfulness, portray lettuce in development in around 2700 B.C. The erect plant like present day romaine, with a thick stem and smooth sap had sexual meanings. Min devoured lettuce as a consecrated nourishment for sexual stamina, and conventional Egyptians utilized the oil of the wild seeds for medication, cooking, and preservation . After some time, the Egyptians reared their wild-type lettuce to have leaves that were not so much harsh but rather more attractive. The developed plants were as yet tall and upstanding, with discrete leaves instead of heads.

The Greeks figured out how to develop lettuce from the Egyptians. They utilized it restoratively as a narcotic and served it as a plate of mixed greens toward the start of dinners to help with assimilation. They likewise kept on developing it for more delectable leaves. In Greek folklore, Aphrodite's sweetheart Adonis was murdered in a bed of lettuce by a pig sent differently by Artemis, who was desirous of his chasing ability, or by Persephone, who was jealous of his fondness for Aphrodite, or by Ares, who was envious of Aphrodite. Whoever the prompting god was, lettuce was related with male feebleness and demise, prompting its introduction at memorial services.

The Greeks passed their lettuce-developing information on to the Romans, who named the plant "lactuca," signifying "milk," for its white sap. In time, "lactuca" turned into the English word "lettuce," while the Roman name was safeguarded in the family name for lettuce and its relatives.

Species

Nabalus species include:

Asian Nabalus species
 Nabalus acerifolius  - Japan
 Nabalus angustilobus  - Sichuan 
 Nabalus faberi  - Guizhou, Sichuan
 Nabalus leptanthus  - Sichuan
 Nabalus nipponicus  - Japan
 Nabalus ochroleucus  - Primorye, Jilin, Korea, Japan
 Nabalus pyramidalis  - Sichuan
 Nabalus racemiformis  - Hebei
 Nabalus tatarinowii  - China, Primorye, Korea

North American Nabalus species
 Nabalus alatus  - western rattlesnake root - AK BC ALB WA OR IDMT
 Nabalus albus  - white rattlesnake root - SAS MAN ONT QUE United States (Great Lakes, Northeast, Appalachians)
 Nabalus altissimus  - tall rattlesnake root - MAN ONT QUE NB NS United States (Northeast, Southeast, South-central)
 Nabalus asper  - rough rattlesnake root - United States (Great Plains, Mississippi Valley)
 Nabalus autumnalis  - slender rattlesnake root - MS FL SC NC VA DE NJ
 Nabalus barbatus  - barbed rattlesnake root - TX OK AR LA KY TN MS AL GA
 Nabalus boottii   - Boott’s rattlesnake root - NY VT NH ME (possibly a synonym of Prenanthes boottii)
 Nabalus crepidineus  - nodding rattlesnake root - MN IA MO AR TN KY IL IN WI MI OH WV PA NY
 Nabalus × mainensis  [N. racemosus × trifoliolatus] - Maine rattlesnake root - NY QUE ME NS NB
 Nabalus racemosus  - glaucous rattlesnake root - Canada, northern United States
 Nabalus roanensis  - Roan Mountain rattlesnake root - southern Appalachians (VA NC TN)
 Nabalus sagittatus  - arrow-leaf rattlesnake root - BC ALB ID MT 
 Nabalus serpentarius  - lion's foot rattlesnake root - eastern United States (MS + FL to NH)
 Nabalus trifoliolatus  - three-leaved rattlesnake root - eastern North America (GA to ONT + LAB)

References

Cichorieae
Asteraceae genera